Terry McMahon is an Irish director, producer, writer, actor and acting coach, best known for his roles in Batman Begins and Patrick's Day.

McMahon was producer, director and writer for Patrick's Day for which he received many awards including 2015 Irish Film and Television Awards, 9 nominations

Early life
McMahon was born in Mullingar, Ireland in 1970.

Career
Terry started acting in 1997 playing the villain Terence Cooney on the RTE Soap Fair City, and in 2007 began his director, writer and producer career. 

He directed the film Patrick's Day released in 2014. His best known acting role was in Batman begins in 2005.

Terry is also an acting coach and gives acting classes in Dublin.

Filmography

Film and Television

Writer

Director

|2020
|The Prizefighter
|Film (Director)

Producer

Thanks

Awards and nominations

References

External links
 

Irish male film actors
Living people
Year of birth missing (living people)
People from Mullingar